"Oh My Sister (Remix)/I'm just going down," (stylized as OH MY SISTER (REMIX)/I'm just going down) is female duo Soulhead's fourth single under Sony Music Entertainment Japan. It reached #114 on the Oricon charts and charted for three weeks.

Information
Oh My Sister (Remix)/I'm just going down was released on both CD and vinyl. Despite having both song titles in the name, the a-side was "I'm just going down." The song was omitted from the corresponding album, Oh My Sister, but the music video was placed on the DVD Oh My Sister Live & Clips.

"I'm just going down" was written and composted by Soulhead and is a song about falling for someone who ends up leaving you, but how you stay strong and keep moving forward.

Track listing

CD
(Source)
"Oh My Sister (REMIX)"
"I'm just going down"
"Oh My Sister (REMIX)" (Instrumental)
"I'm just going down" (Instrumental)

12" Vinyl
Side A
"Oh My Sister (REMIX)"
"Oh My Sister (REMIX)" (Instrumental)
"Oh My Sister (REMIX)" (A Capella)
Side B
"I'm just going down"
"I'm just going down" (Instrumental)
"I'm just going down" (A Capella)

Charts and sales

References

2003 singles
Sony Music Entertainment Japan singles